Scherer and Scherrer is a German language surname widespread in German speaking Europe since the Middle Ages. With the beginning of colonization it also came to North and South America. It may refer to:

Scherer 
 Alfredo Scherer (1903–1996), Brazilian Roman Catholic prelate
 Axel Scherer (professor), American physicist
 Barthélemy Louis Joseph Schérer (1747–1804), French general during the French Revolution
 Bee Scherer (born Burkhard Scherer, 1971), English professor of gender studies and religious studies at Canterbury Christ Church University
 Bernie Scherer (1913–2004), American football player
 Dave Scherer, American sports writer and journalist
 Edmond Henri Adolphe Schérer (1815–1889), French politician
 Emanuel Scherer (1901–1977), Polish-Jewish politician
 Fernando Scherer (born 1974), Brazilian swimmer
 Frederic M. Scherer (born 1932), American economist
 Gabriela Scherer (born 1981), Swiss mezzosoprano
 Georg Scherer (1540–1605), Roman Catholic pulpit orator and controversialist 
 Giorgio Scherer (1831-1896), Italian painter, mainly of genre paintings
 Gordon H. Scherer (1906–1988), American politician
 Hermann Scherer (1893-1927), German-speaking Swiss Expressionist 
 Irineu Roque Scherer (1950–2016), Roman Catholic bishop
 James A. B. Scherer (1870–1944), American educator and Lutheran minister
 Jean Marie Maurice Schérer, better known as Éric Rohmer, French film director, film critic, journalist, novelist, screenwriter, and teacher
 Johann Andreas Scherer (1755–1844), Austrian chemist and botanist
 Johann Jakob Scherer (1825–1878), Swiss politician for the Free Democratic Party of Switzerland
 Johann Joseph Scherer (1814–1869), German chemist
 John Scherer (athlete) (1966–), former American long-distance runner for the Michigan Wolverines
 Julio Scherer García (1926–2015), Mexican author and journalist
 Klaus Scherer (born 1943), Swiss psychologist
 Lee R. Scherer (1919-2011), American aeronautical engineer and director of NASA's John F. Kennedy Space Center (KSC) from January 19, 1975 to September 2, 1979
 Leopoldo García-Colín Scherer (1930–2012), Mexican scientist specialized in Thermodynamics
 Lucy Scherer (born 1981), German actress
 Luther B. Scherer, also known as Tutor Scherer, (1879–1957), American casino investor in Las Vegas, Nevada
 Maria Katherina Scherer, (1825–1888), Swiss Roman Catholic professed religious and the co-founder of the Sisters of Mercy of the Holy Cross
 Marie-Luise Scherer (1938-2022), German author and journalist
 Markus Scherer (born 1962), German former wrestler 
 Martin Scherer (born 1972), German physician
 Michelle Scherer, American environmental geochemist
 Odilo Scherer (born 1949), Brazilian Brazilian Roman Catholic prelate
 Péter Scherer (born 1961), Hungarian stage and film actor
 René Schérer (1922–2023), French philosopher
 Rip Scherer (born 1952), American coach
 Robert Pauli Scherer (1906–1960), American inventor
 Roger H. Scherer (1935-2022), American lawyer and politician
 Rodolphe Scherer (born 1972), French equestrian 
 Roy Scherer Jr., better known as Rock Hudson, American actor
 Sarah Scherer (born 1991), American enthusiast of My Little Ponies
 Sebastian Anton Scherer (1631–1712), German composer and organist of the Baroque era
 Siegfried Scherer (born 1955), German biologist
 Sophie Ritter von Scherer (1817–1876), Austrian writer
 Stephen Scherer (1989–2010), Cadet with the class of 2011 at the United States Military Academy who competed in the 2008 Olympic Games in 10 metre air rifle
 Stephen W. Scherer (born 1964), Canadian scientist
 Susan Scherer (born 1956),  played for the Canadian National women's ice hockey team from 1989 to 1992
 Theodor Scherer (1889–1951), German general during both World Wars, received the Knight's Cross of the Iron Cross
 Wilhelm Scherer (1841–1886), German philologist

Scherrer 
 Albert Scherrer (1908–1986), Swiss racing driver
 Bill Scherrer (born 1958), American baseball player
 Dominik Scherrer, Swiss-born British film, theatre and television composer
 Eduard Scherrer (1890–1972), Swiss bobsledder
 Jean-Louis Scherrer (1935–2013), French fashion designer
 Hélène Scherrer (born 1950), Canadian politician
 Paul Scherrer (1890–1969), Swiss physicist
 Tom Scherrer (born 1970), American golfer

Place names

 Schererville, Indiana

 Scherersville, Pennsylvania

Businesses

Shannon & Scherer, architectural firm

Riker, Danzig, Scherer, Hyland & Perretti, law firm

 Scherer
 Plant Scherer, a coal-fired power plant in Juliette, Georgia
 Scherrer
 Paul Scherrer Institute
 Shearer (disambiguation)

References 

German-language surnames

de:Scherer (Begriffsklärung)